Ptolemy XV Caesar (23 June 47 BC – August 30 BC), nicknamed Caesarion ("Little Caesar"), was the last pharaoh of Ptolemaic Egypt, reigning with his mother Cleopatra from 2 September 44 BC until her death by 12 August 30 BC, then as sole ruler until his death was ordered by Octavian (who would become the first Roman emperor as Augustus).

Caesarion was the eldest son of Cleopatra and the only known biological son of Julius Caesar, after whom he was named. He was the last sovereign member of the Ptolemaic dynasty of Egypt.

Early life

Ptolemy Caesar Philopator Philometor was born in Egypt on 23 June 47 BC. His mother Cleopatra insisted that he was the son of Roman politician and dictator Julius Caesar, and while he was said to have inherited Caesar's looks and manner, Caesar did not officially acknowledge him. One of Caesar's supporters, Gaius Oppius, even wrote a pamphlet which attempted to prove that Caesar could not have fathered Caesarion. Nevertheless, Caesar may have allowed Caesarion to use his name. The matter became contentious when Caesar's adopted son, Octavian, came into conflict with Cleopatra.

Caesarion spent two of his infant years, from 46 to 44 BC, in Rome, where he and his mother were Caesar's guests at his villa, Horti Caesaris. Cleopatra hoped that her son would eventually succeed his father as the head of the Roman Republic, as well as of Egypt. After Caesar's assassination on 15 March 44 BC, Cleopatra and Caesarion returned to Egypt. Caesarion was named co-ruler by his mother on 2 September 44 BC at the age of three, although he was pharaoh in name only, with Cleopatra keeping actual authority. Cleopatra compared her relationship to her son with that of the Egyptian goddess Isis and her divine child Horus.

There is no historical record of Caesarion between 44 BC until the Donations of Antioch in 36 BC. Two years later he also appears at the Donations of Alexandria. Cleopatra and Antony staged both "Donations" to donate lands dominated by Rome and Parthia to Cleopatra's children: Caesarion, the twins Alexander Helios and Cleopatra Selene II, and Ptolemy Philadelphus (the last three were his maternal half-siblings fathered by Mark Antony). Octavian gave public approval to the Donations of Antioch in 36 BC, which have been described as an Antonian strategy to rule the East making use of Cleopatra's unique royal Seleucid lineage in the regions donated.

Pharaoh 
In 34 BC, Antony granted further eastern lands and titles to Caesarion and his own three children with Cleopatra in the Donations of Alexandria. Caesarion was proclaimed to be a god, a son of [a] god, and "King of Kings". This grandiose title was "unprecedented in the management of Roman client-king relationships" and could be seen as "threatening the 'greatness' of the Roman people". Antony also declared Caesarion to be Caesar's true son and heir. This declaration was a direct threat to Octavian (whose claim to power was based on his status as Julius Caesar's grandnephew and adopted son). These proclamations partly caused the fatal breach in Antony's relations with Octavian, who used Roman resentment over the Donations to gain support for war against Antony and Cleopatra.

Death 

After the defeat of Mark Antony and Cleopatra at the Battle of Actium in 31 BC, Cleopatra seems to have groomed Caesarion to take over as "sole ruler without his mother". She may have intended to go into exile, perhaps with Antony, who may have hoped that he would be allowed to retire as Lepidus had. Caesarion reappears in the historical record in 30 BC, when Octavian invaded Egypt and searched for him. Cleopatra may have sent Caesarion, 17 years old at the time, to the Red Sea port of Berenice for safety, possibly as part of plans for an escape to India.  Plutarch does say that Caesarion was sent to India, but also that he was lured back by false promises of the kingdom of Egypt: Caesarion, who was said to be Cleopatra's son by Julius Caesar, was sent by his mother, with much treasure, into India, by way of Ethiopia. There Rhodon, another tutor like Theodorus, persuaded him to go back, on the ground that [Octavian] Caesar invited him to take the kingdom.

Octavian captured the city of Alexandria on 1 August 30 BC, the date that marks the official annexation of Egypt to the Roman Republic. Around this time Mark Antony and Cleopatra died, traditionally said to be by suicide, though murder has been suggested.

Octavian is supposed to have had Pharaoh Caesarion executed in Alexandria, following the advice of Arius Didymus, who said "Too many Caesars is not good" (a pun on a line in Homer). It is popularly thought that he was strangled, but the exact circumstances of his death have not been documented. Octavian then assumed absolute control of Egypt. The year 30 BC was considered the first year of the new ruler's reign according to the traditional chronological system of Egypt.

Depictions

Few images of Caesarion survive. He is thought to be depicted in a partial statue found in the harbor of Alexandria in 1997 and is also portrayed twice in relief, as an adult pharaoh, with his mother on the Temple of Hathor at Dendera. His infant image appears on some bronze coins of Cleopatra.

Egyptian names
In addition to his Greek name and nicknames, Caesarion also had a full set of royal names in the Egyptian language:
Iwapanetjer entynehem – "Heir of the god who saves"
Setepenptah – "Chosen of Ptah"
Irmaatenre – "Carrying out the rule of Ra" or "Sun of righteousness"
Sekhemankhamun – "Living image of Amun"

See also
Caesareum of Alexandria
Julia gens
Reign of Cleopatra
List of unsolved murders

Notes

References

External links
 Ptolemy XV Caesarion entry in historical sourcebook by Mahlon H. Smith

47 BC births
30 BC deaths
1st-century BC executions
1st-century BC Pharaohs
 
Children of Cleopatra
Children of Julius Caesar
Executed ancient Egyptian people
Executed monarchs
Male murder victims
Missing person cases in Egypt
People executed by the Roman Republic
Pharaohs of the Ptolemaic dynasty
Unsolved murders in Egypt
Executed children